Bina Assembly constituency is one of the 230 Vidhan Sabha (Legislative Assembly) constituencies of Madhya Pradesh state in central India. This constituency is reserved for the candidates belonging to the Scheduled castes since 2008, following the delimitation of the Legislative Assembly constituencies.

Overview
Bina (constituency number 35) is one of the 8 Vidhan Sabha constituencies located in Sagar district. This constituency presently covers the entire Bina tehsil and part of Khurai tehsil of the district.

Bina is part of Sagar Lok Sabha constituency along with seven other Vidhan Sabha segments, namely, Khurai,  Surkhi, Naryoli and Sagar in this district and Kurwai, Sironj and Shamshabad in Vidisha district.

Members of Legislative Assembly
 1957: Ram Lal Nayak, Janta Party
 1962: Bhagirath, Bharatiya Jana Sangh
 1967: B. K. Pateriya, Indian National Congress
 1972: Dalchand Bhagwandas, Indian National Congress (I)
 1977: Bhagirath Balgaiya, Janata Party
 1980: Arvind Bhai, Indian National Congress (I)
 1985: Sudhakar Bapat, Bharatiya Janata Party
 1990: Sudhakar Bapat, Bharatiya Janata Party
 1993: Prabhu Singh Thakur, Indian National Congress (I)
 1998: Sudhakar Bapat, Bharatiya Janata Party
 2003: Sushila Rakesh Sirothiya, Bharatiya Janata Party
 2008: Smt Dr. Vinod Panthi, Bharatiya Janata Party

See also
 Bina Etawa

References

Sagar district
Assembly constituencies of Madhya Pradesh